Grand-papa is a French-Canadian téléroman which aired on SRC Télévision between 1976 and 1979. Written by Janette Bertrand, the series totaled 115 episodes.

Plot
The series is centered on Charles-Henri Lamontagne, an elderly widower coping with the death of his wife, and his influence on his family in Montreal. Through the script, Janette Bertrand explores sensitive issues still taboo for the Quebec society in the late 1970s.

Rerun
Radio-Canada started to re-air the show on September 10, 2008. It is scheduled to air Mondays to Fridays at 3:30 p.m.

Cast
 Sophie Clément – Shirley
 Pierre Dufresne – Jean-Paul
 Yves Fortin – Jean-François
 Amulette Garneau – Armande
 Johanne Garneau – Lise
 Marie Guimont – Anémone Lamontagne
 Rita Lafontaine – Martine
 Jean Lajeunesse – Charles-Henri Lamontagne
 Lucie St-Cyr – Rose Lamontagne

External links
 Grand-papa at TVArchive.ca

1970s Canadian drama television series
Téléromans
Ici Radio-Canada Télé original programming
1976 Canadian television series debuts
1979 Canadian television series endings
Television shows set in Montreal